Nationality words link to articles with information on the nation's poetry or literature (for instance, Irish or France).

Events
 Christopher Marlowe wrote The Passionate Shepherd to His Love either this year or in 1588 (first published 1599)

Works published

Great Britain
 William Byrd, Psalmes, Sonets & Songs of Sadnes and Pietie, Made into Musicke of Five Parts, verse and music
 Thomas Deloney, A New Ballet of the Straunge and Most Cruell Whippes which the Spanyards Had Prepared to Whippe and Torment English Men and Women, a ballad
 Anne Dowriche (A.D.), The French Historie
 Anthony Munday, A Banquet of Daintie Conceits
 George Puttenham, authorship uncertain, Arte of English Poesie, the first draft is thought to have been written in the 1560s, with revisions thereafter, up to its publication; the most systematic and comprehensive treatise of the time on poetry; "contrived into three bookes: the first of poets and poesies [a general history of poetry and descriptions of various forms], the second of proportion [on prosody and the measures in use in English verse], the third of ornament [on style, the distinctions between written and spoken language and other matters]" the work concludes with lengthy observations on good manners
 Sir Philip Sidney, Defense of Poesie, criticism
 Nicholas Yonge, Musica Transalpina. Cantus, verse and music (see also Musica Transalpina 1597)

Other
 Flor de Varios Romances Nuevos, a famous Spanish poetry anthology; includes 12 romances by Luis de Góngora y Argote
 Alonso de Ercilla, La Araucana, an epic poem about the conquest of Chile; the first part originally appeared in 1569, the second part was published for the first time om 1578  (together with the first part), the third part was published for the first time this year (together with the first and second parts); Spain

Births
 January 9 – Ivan Gundulić (died 1638), Croatian Baroque poet
 February 5
 Honorat de Bueil, seigneur de Racan (died 1670), French aristocrat, soldier, poet, dramatist and original member of the Académie française
 Esteban Manuel de Villegas (died 1669), Spanish
Also:
 Konstantinos Kallokratos (died unknown) Greek teacher and poet
 Antoine Le Métel d'Ouville (born about this year (died 1655), French engineer, geographer, poet, playwright and author
 Jean Sirmond (died 1649), French neo-Latin poet and man of letters

Deaths
 October 15 – Jean-Antoine de Baïf (born 1532), French poet and member of La Pléiade
Also:
 Heo Nanseolheon (born 1563), Korean scholar and poet writing mainly in Chinese, a woman
 Mathias Holtzwart died sometime after this year (born about 1540), German
 Pavel Kyrmezer (birth year not known), Slovak
 Thomas Sébillet (born 1512), French lawyer, essayist, neo-Platonist grammarian and writer on poetry

See also

 Poetry
 16th century in poetry
 16th century in literature
 Dutch Renaissance and Golden Age literature
 Elizabethan literature
 English Madrigal School
 French Renaissance literature
 Renaissance literature
 Spanish Renaissance literature
 University Wits

Notes

16th-century poetry
Poetry